Roberto Octavio González Nieves, O.F.M. (born June 2, 1950) is an American prelate of the Catholic Church. He has been serving as archbishop of the Archdiocese of San Juan in Puerto Rico since 1999. 

González previously served as an auxiliary bishop of the Archdiocese of Boston in Massachusetts from 1988 to 1995, and as bishop of the Diocese of Corpus Christi in Texas from 1997 to 1999 after two years as coadjutor. He devoted his first decade as a priest to pastoral work in the Bronx borough of New York City.

Biography

Early life and education 
Roberto González was born in Elizabeth, New Jersey, on June 2, 1950, to Puerto Rican parents. His father was a graduate of Seton Hall. He moved with his family to San Juan and grew up in a parish staffed by Franciscans. He has described himself as "a child of the Puerto Rican diaspora, my emotional and primary homeland". From 1957 to 1964 he attended Academia Santa Monica in Santurce, a district of San Juan, and then began his priestly formation at St. Joseph Seraphic Minor Seminary in Callicoon, New York, from 1964 to 1968. He graduated from Siena College in Loudonville, New York, in 1973 with a B.A. in English.

González was accepted as a candidate for the Franciscans at Christ House in Lafayette, New Jersey, in 1970 and he entered the novitiate of the Order at St. Francis Friary in Brookline, Massachusetts, in 1971. González professed his first vows on 25 August 1974 and his solemn vows on 21 August 1976.

González earned a Master of Sacred Theology degree in 1977 from the Washington Theological Coalition in Silver Spring, Maryland. He earned a master's degree in 1978 and then his doctorate in 1984, both in sociology, at Fordham University in New York City. His these was Ecological, Ethnic and Cultural Factors of Church Practice in an Urban Roman Catholic Church.

Priest
On May 8, 1977, González was ordained a priest for the Franciscans by Lorenzo Graziano, Bishop Emeritus of San Miguel in El Salvador, himself a Franciscan. Beginning in 1982, González served at St. Pius V Parish and then from 1986 to 1988 at Holy Cross Parish, both in the Bronx. In 1987, New York City Mayor Ed Koch included González as one of his six appointees to the New York City Police Review Panel.

Bishop
On July 19, 1988, Pope John Paul II appointed González an auxiliary bishop of the Archdiocese of Boston and titular bishop of Ursona. He received his episcopal consecration in Boston on October 3, 1988, from Cardinal Bernard Law, with two cardinals as co-consecrators: John O'Connor of New York and Luis Aponte Martínez of San Juan.

On May 16, 1995, González was appointed coadjutor bishop of the Diocese of Corpus Christi in Texas by John Paul II. On April 1, 1997, he succeeded as bishop of the diocese upon the retirement of Bishop René Gracida.

He served on two committees of the United States Conference of Catholic Bishops: Hispanic Affairs and the Church in Latin America.

Archbishop of San Juan
On March 26, 1999, González was appointed archbishop of the Archdiocese of San Juan by John Paul II. He was installed as archbishop on May 8, 1999. Attendees included the mayor of San Juan, Sila Calderón and former Governor Carlos Romero Barceló. González' retiring predecessor, Cardinal Luis Aponte Martínez, observed that the ceremony marked the first time that a Puerto Rican archbishop handed the see over to another Puerto Rican archbishop.

Almost immediately, González raised his profile across the island. In September 1999, he joined Rev. Jesse Jackson at an interfaith prayer service in East Harlem in New York City, where he preached in Spanish on themes of Puerto Rican nationalism and anti-colonialism. He distanced himself from any specific position on the legal status of Puerto Rico, but said he favored institutions that "foster the national identity of the Puerto Rican people". He has articulated outspoken and often controversial views, particularly in defense of the US Navy-Vieques protests and in his denunciation of homosexuality, among other things. His actions in the Vieques protests won him international notoriety, and he has been viewed as a strong Latin-American leader of the Catholic Church.

González has proclaimed his pride in being Puerto Rican, has asked the U.S. Government to work hard to preserve the national identity of Puerto Ricans, and criticized political corruption in Puerto Rico.

During the spring of 2006, along with several Protestant leaders, he was instrumental in persuading Puerto Rican Governor Aníbal Acevedo Vilá, Senate President Kenneth McClintock, and House Speaker José Aponte Hernández to resolve Puerto Rico's fiscal crisis, which had sparked a two-week-long government shutdown.

Apostolic visitation
In 2011, González was the target of charges that he was mismanaging the archdiocese. The Congregation for the Clergy, with the backing of the Congregation for Bishops, appointed an apostolic visitor, Archbishop Antonio Arregui Yarza of Guayaquil in Ecuador, to conduct an investigation, which he began on October 25. Archbishop Jozef Wesolowski, was eventually identified as Gonzalez' "principal and most insistent accuser". Since becoming apostolic delegate to Puerto Rico in 2008, he had clashed repeatedly with González, particularly disturbed, according to La Stampa, by González' Puerto Rican advocacy. He submitted confidential reports that included claims González had mishandled cases of priests accused of sexual abuse and sold Catholic school property without authorization. González indicated he would contest, in particular, any claim that he had not properly dealt with charges of sexual abuse on the part of priests.

As González awaited the results of the investigation, the bishops of Puerto Rico demonstrated their confidence in him by electing him the president of their conference in December 2012. That same month he refused when pressured to resign by Vatican officials, responding instead with a lengthy rebuttal in February 2023. When details of the standoff became public, almost a hundred Catholic organizations formed a coalition to demonstrate their solidarity with González.

The Vatican cleared González of all the charges against him in June 2013. In August, Wesolowski was removed as apostolic delegate and the failure of the Vatican to credit his claims against González was thought to explain his departure. Wesolowski was in fact removed because he was suspected of sexually abusing minors. After a canonical trial he was laicized in June 2014.

Altar of the Homeland
In 2013, he succeeded in arranging for the remains of Puerto Rican "founding father" Ramón Power y Giralt (1775–1813) to be transferred from Spain to Puerto Rico. He worked with the Bishop of Cádiz and Ceuta to accomplish this project which had long been frustrated by political infighting and bureaucratic hurdles, despite the fact that Power is recognized as a hero by all of Puerto Rico's political factions. González had prepared a mausoleum chapel alongside the Cathedral of San Juan Bautista to receive the remains of Power and of Juan Alejo de Arizmendi, the first Puerto Rican bishop of San Juan, but in December 2022 Cardinal Tarcisio Bertone, the Holy See's Secretary of State, had ordered González not to proceed with the internments and to stop calling the chapel, which Gonzalez inaugurated in 2011, the altar de la patria.

Power's remains arrived in San Juan on April 6, 2013; González called the transfer "a boost to our identity" and a moment of clarification for Puerto Rico. By then González could count on support from his friend, the newly elected Pope Francis, and on May 18 the Congregation for Divine Worship told him it had no objection to moving Power's remains into the cathedral. On June 2, González decreed the establishment of the "Chapel of the Holy Christ of the entire Puerto Rican nation" to serve as "a privileged place dedicated to prayer for Puerto Rico, its nation, including its diaspora and all its inhabitants". On June 10, 2013, the 200th anniversary of Power's death in Cádiz, his remains and those of Arizmendi were reinterred in the chapel. González said: "If this Altar of the Homeland leads us to erect an Altar of the Homeland in our hearts, then all this effort has been worth it."

Other activities 
Since 2013, filmmaker Richard Rossi has promoted the cause for sainthood of baseball player Roberto Clemente, a process which needs to begin in the Archdiocese of San Juan where Clemente died. Despite periodic false reports of action on the part of the Vatican or Pope Francis, the archdiocese has not confirmed that the process has begun. Rossi has said that Gonzalez "has been less passionate than Pope Francis" about Clemente's chances, but the Washington Post was unable as of 2017 to establish that the pope is aware of the case. Gonzalez has not made his views known.

He attend both sessions of the Synod of Bishops on the Family as president of the Episcopal Conference of Puerto Rico in October 2014 and October 2015. At the 2015 meeting, he described the current practice of divorced and remarried Catholics approaching the priest with their arms crossed to receive a blessing and called it "a manifestation of the desire of sacramental communion" in which "they humble themselves before the community by making clear to all their illegal status; as if to say: Mea culpa, mea culpa, mea maxima culpa!" He suggested a pastoral approach that would guide them on a "penitential journey", questioned the requirement that a spouse abandon their partner in an unsanctioned marriage, and underscored "the efficacy of the penitential sacrament as a sacrament of conversion".

Honors
González has received honorary doctorates from St. Bonaventure University (New York), Universidad Central de Bayamón (Puerto Rico), Siena College (New York), and the Graduate Theological Foundation (Puerto Rico). Regis College in Massachusetts awarded him its Presidential Medal in 2000. Fordham awarded him its Sapientia et Doctrina award in recognition of his contributions to Hispanic ministry in 2009.

References

External links

Roman Catholic Archdiocese of San Juan de Puerto Rico (Official Site in Spanish)
 
 

1950 births
Living people
Religious leaders from Texas
20th-century Roman Catholic bishops in the United States
21st-century Roman Catholic archbishops in Puerto Rico
People from San Juan, Puerto Rico
Siena College alumni
Fordham University alumni
Washington Theological Union alumni
American Friars Minor
Puerto Rican sociologists
Franciscan bishops
Roman Catholic archbishops of San Juan de Puerto Rico